The Alfredo Di Stéfano Trophy is an annual association football award presented by Spanish sports newspaper Marca to the best footballer of La Liga. The award is named after former Real Madrid player Alfredo Di Stéfano. The first edition was awarded in the 2007–08 season Lionel Messi holds the record for the number of wins, with seven.

Winners

Wins by player

See also
Trofeo EFE
Don Balón Award
Pichichi Trophy
Zarra Trophy
Ricardo Zamora Trophy
Miguel Muñoz Trophy
Trofeo Aldo Rovira

References

External links
 1st Trofeo Di Stéfano Marca.com
 2nd Trofeo Di Stéfano Marca.com
 3rd Trofeo Di Stéfano Marca.com
 4th Trofeo Di Stéfano Marca.com
 5th Trofeo Di Stéfano Marca.com

La Liga trophies and awards
Spanish football trophies and awards
2008 establishments in Spain
Awards established in 2008
Annual events in Spain